Şükran Ovalı (born 1 April 1985) is a Turkish actress.

Life and career
Ovalı was born in the Eşrefpaşa district of İzmir. She spent most of her childhood in Bahçelievler, İzmir. After studying at Mustafa Urcan Primary School and Fevzi Çakmak Secondary School, she finished her high school education at Göztepe Selma Yiğit Alp High School, after which she went to Istanbul. She studied acting at Müjdat Gezen Art Center.

She made her television debut with the series Sırlar Dünyası, after which she appeared in various TV series. In 2006, she had her first cinematic experience with a role in the movie Pars: Kiraz Operasyonu. Her breakthrough came with fantasy child series Bez Bebek. She also had a role in the period drama series Kötü Yol, based on a classic novel. Alongside Şükrü Özyıldız, she appeared in the series Ekşi Elmalar and Şeref Meselesi.

Filmography

Series

Film

Awards 
22nd Sadri Alışık Theatre and Cinema Awards - Selection Committee Special Award (Ekşi Elmalar)

References

External links 
 
 

1985 births
Living people
Turkish television actresses
Turkish film actresses
Association footballers' wives and girlfriends